Lasiosomus is a genus of true bugs belonging to the family Rhyparochromidae.

The species of this genus are found in Europe.

Species:
 Lasiosomus cameroonensis O'Rourke, 1975 
 Lasiosomus enervis (Herrich-Schaeffer, 1835)

References

Rhyparochromidae